Yera Allon, also known as Chameleon Girl, is a fictional character, a superheroine and Legion of Super-Heroes member in the DC Universe's 30th and 31st centuries.

Pre-Zero Hour
In the original pre-Zero Hour continuity, veteran Legionnaire Colossal Boy (Gim Allon) was finally able to act upon his unrequited feelings for his teammate Shrinking Violet when the two apparently became a romantic couple. The relationship developed fairly quickly, and the two were soon married. The pairing was a surprise to almost everyone, as she had been previously linked with Duplicate Boy, a member of the Heroes of Lallor and one of the most powerful beings of the 30th century. When Duplicate Boy learned of the relationship, he tracked the couple down and proceeded to beat Colossal Boy mercilessly until he realized what no one else had yet deduced: the woman involved with Colossal Boy was not Shrinking Violet.

In reality, Shrinking Violet had been kidnapped by radicals from her native planet Imsk. She was replaced in the Legion by Yera, a Durlan actress who used her native shapeshifting abilities to assume Violet's identity and mimic her shrinking powers. Yera was an unwitting pawn in the plot, as the radicals had told her that Violet wished to go on a secret vacation. When "Violet" became involved with Colossal Boy, Legion deputy leader Element Lad and Science Police liaison Shvaughn Erin became suspicious, particularly since "Violet" was seemingly cheating on Duplicate Boy without trying to hide it. Along with Brainiac 5 and Chameleon Boy, they were able to expose Yera as an imposter, and rescue the real Violet.  However, the passion between Gim and Yera was genuine, and he remained with her despite the initial deception.

Shrinking Violet harbored resentment toward Yera for years, despite the fact that the Durlan had been duped herself. In the "Five Years Later" version of Legion continuity, Violet finally forgave Yera.

Post-Infinite Crisis
The events of the Infinite Crisis miniseries have apparently restored a close analogue of the Pre-Crisis on Infinite Earths Legion to continuity, as seen in "The Lightning Saga" story arc in Justice League of America and Justice Society of America, and in the Action Comics story arc "Superman and the Legion of Super-Heroes".  Yera has joined the Legion and assumed the code name Chameleon Girl.

However, because the events following the "Five Year Gap" have not been reincorporated into current continuity, Chameleon Girl and Shrinking Violet remain at odds with one another.

Legion Lost, volume 2
As of 2011, Yera is stranded on 21st century Earth (along with teammates Wildfire, Dawnstar, Timber Wolf, Tyroc, Tellus and Gates) on a mission to save the future. Additionally, they discover that they must remain in that time period, after learning that they may have contracted a pathogen that could destroy the 31st century if they return.

References

Characters created by Keith Giffen
Characters created by Pat Broderick
Characters created by Paul Levitz
Comics characters introduced in 1982
Comics characters introduced in 1983
DC Comics aliens
DC Comics characters who are shapeshifters
DC Comics extraterrestrial superheroes
DC Comics female superheroes